Won Woo-young (Hangul: 원우영; ; born 3 February 1982) is a South Korean sabre fencer. He won gold at the Olympics, World Championships, Asian Games and Asian Championships and is the first Asian fencer to win gold in the men's individual sabre event at the World Championships.

After retiring, he became a sports commentator for Seoul Broadcasting System and covered fencing events at various international tournaments. In November 2021, he was appointed coach of the men's sabre team.

Early life
Won attended Hongik University High School, then one of the few schools in Seoul with a fencing team, and was a year ahead of future sabre teammate Kim Jung-hwan. One of their seniors was foil fencer and future Olympic silver medalist Choi Byung-chul. He graduated from Korea National Sport University in 2004.

Career
Won began competing internationally in 2004 and won the bronze medal at the sabre 2006 World Fencing Championships, after losing 15-10 to Zsolt Nemcsik in the semi-final. At the sabre 2010 World Fencing Championships, he won the gold medal, beating then-world number 1 Nicolas Limbach 15–9 in the final. It was the first time an Asian fencer had won the gold medal at a sabre event in the World Championships.

Won, together with Oh Eun-seok, Kim Jung-hwan and Gu Bon-gil, were selected for the national team to compete at the 2012 Summer Olympics The Olympics began on a sour note for them as he, Kim and Gu all did not make it past the semi-final stage of the individual event; he lost in the last 16 to Nikolay Kovalev, the eventual bronze medallist. They managed to win a historic gold in the team event, South Korea's first ever Olympic gold medal in the men's team sabre category. The quartet continued to dominate in the team events; in the year 2014 alone they swept gold at both the Asian Championships and Asian Games hosted at home and won silver at the World Championships. They had a disappointing run at the 2015 World Championships as none of them reached the final in the individual event and then lost by only a point to France in the quarter-finals of the team event. A week later, they successfully defended their team gold medal at the Asian Championships, his last major international competition. He and Oh both retired from the national team at the end of the season.

In 2016 Won was awarded the Order of Sports Merit Cheongnyong (Hangul: 청룡장; English: Blue Dragon) class, the South Korean government's highest honor bestowed on professional athletes who meet the criteria.

Medal Record

Olympic Games

World Championships

World Cup

Grand Prix

Post-retirement
Won retired from the national team in 2015 but continued to play amateurly and coach at his club. He also became a commentator for SBS and covered fencing events at the 2016 and 2020 Summer Olympics and the 2018 Asian Games.

In November 2021, ahead of the Orleans Grand Prix, the Korean Fencing Federation announced that Won had been appointed coach of the men's sabre team.

Personal life
Won married his girlfriend of three years, a flight attendant, in September 2015.

References

External links
 Profile and Career Statistics at the FIE website

1982 births
Living people
South Korean male sabre fencers
Fencers from Seoul
Fencers at the 2012 Summer Olympics
Olympic fencers of South Korea
Olympic gold medalists for South Korea
Olympic medalists in fencing
Medalists at the 2012 Summer Olympics
Asian Games medalists in fencing
Fencers at the 2006 Asian Games
Fencers at the 2010 Asian Games
Fencers at the 2014 Asian Games
Asian Games gold medalists for South Korea
Asian Games silver medalists for South Korea
Medalists at the 2006 Asian Games
Medalists at the 2010 Asian Games
Medalists at the 2014 Asian Games
South Korean Buddhists
Korea National Sport University alumni
South Korean sports commentators